Korjenići, also historically known as Vrm, is a historical region and medieval župa in south-east Bosnia and Herzegovina, in the region of East Herzegovina, several kilometers north-east of Trebinje, around a village of Klobuk. It was known as Vrm (Врм) until the 18th century, being a historical župa (county) in the Middle Ages. It was mentioned in the Chronicle of the Priest of Duklja (ca. 1300) as one of ten župas of Travunija.

References

Sources

External links

Herzegovina
Župas of the medieval Bosnian state